Oak Top, also known as The Smith Place, is a historic mansion in Clarksville, Tennessee, U.S.. It was built in the 1850s for Thomas W. Wisdom, a county judge. From 1869 to 1890, it was owned by Sterling Beaumont, a tobacco industrialist and banker.

The house was designed in the Greek Revival architectural style. It has been listed on the National Register of Historic Places since July 8, 1980.

References

National Register of Historic Places in Montgomery County, Tennessee
Greek Revival architecture in Tennessee
Houses completed in 1855